Chamasiri is a settlement in Kenya's Busia County, close to the Ugandan border.

References 

Populated places in Western Province (Kenya)
Busia County